Kilhallon is a hamlet in the civil parish of Tywardreath and Par, Cornwall, England.

References

Hamlets in Cornwall
St Blazey